Raees ( Rich) is a 2017 Indian Hindi-language action film directed by Rahul Dholakia and produced by Red Chillies Entertainment and Excel Entertainment. It stars Shah Rukh Khan, Nawazuddin Siddiqui and Mahira Khan. Raees is said to be based on the criminal Abdul Latif's life, however, the filmmakers have denied this.

The film was released on 25 January 2017 during India's Republic Day weekend. It received overall positive reviews from the critics, who appreciated the performances of Khan and Siddiqui, production design, cinematography and visual effects, and was a huge success at the box office, becoming  the 6th highest-grossing Hindi film of 2017 Raees was also the most pirated Hindi film of 2017. The film's soundtrack has also received over 160 crore (1.6billion) streams on YouTube. The film received five nominations at the 63rd Filmfare Awards, including Best Actor for Khan. It became the 47th highest-grossing Indian film of all time.

Plot 
The film begins in the 1960s (evident from a newspaper).

Raees, a sharp-minded boy, lives in Fatehpur, Gujarat, a dry state and gets involved in the illegal liquor trade from a young age. He uses his mother's philosophy: no occupation is low and no religion greater than any occupation as a mechanism of self-deception. Along with his best friend, Sadiq, he starts working for a local gangster, Jairaj — who prefers Raees as he comes up with novel ideas for smuggling. As his power and influence grow, he decides to part ways with Jairaj and takes the help of a crime boss, Musabhai to start his own business. He gains immense popularity in his community: he provides them liquor, employs them for receiving and delivering orders and thus enjoys political support from both the Chief Minister and Pashabhai, the leader of the opposition.

Meanwhile, an honest and powerful police officer, ACP J. A. Majmudar is transferred to Fatehpur and starts a major crackdown on alcohol dealers, focusing on Raees. This affects most of the dealers except him as he manages to smuggle past Majmudar — leading to hostile relations and a failed assassination attempt by Jairaj. Raees subsequently kills him in retaliation. In the meantime, Raees marries his neighbour Aasiya and has a son with her.

At the baby shower, he convinces the CM to transfer Majmudar to the Police Control Room and takes on a new real-estate project offered to him. With Majmudar gone and construction in full swing, all seems to be going well for him. Majmudar, however, is still keeping track of his activities through phone taps and moles he planted earlier.

Raees publicly assaults Pashabhai over a disagreement and the CM sends him to jail temporarily as a PR stunt. With Raees locked up, the CM and Pasha ally the upcoming local elections. Realizing he has been betrayed, Raees decides to stand in the elections, uses his popularity and wins.

Seeing him as an imminent threat, the CM recalls Majmudar back to Fatehpur and declares his real-estate project's plot as protected land — rendering the construction illegal. Raees incurs huge debt to his community, whom he had convinced to invest in the project. To worsen the situation, communal rioting in the state leads to the imposition of a curfew jeopardizing his liquor business.

Completely broke, a desperate Raees reaches out to Musabhai for help, who offers him money for smuggling in gold by sea. Soon, serial bombings occur across India. Raees becomes aware that Musa used the gold as a cover to smuggle RDX. The police lead a massive cross-country crackdown; all of Raees's associates are either caught or killed. Heartbroken and grieving, Raees kills Musabhai and his men for using him to kill innocents. Subsequently, he surrenders to Majmudar, well aware that he will kill him. Majmudar and Raees deliberate over their time together, following which Majmudar shoots Raees. As he falls, he recalls memories from his life and his mother's teachings. Majmudar drives away, musing about Raees's last words.

Cast

Production

Filming and development 
The shooting of the film began in April 2015. The film has been shot in Mumbai, and sets were re-designed to depict Ahmedabad slums. The last schedule of the film was shot in Gujarat in January 2016. Despite protests, the film was shot in Bhuj without disruptions between January and February 2016. There was a clearance issue by the Archaeological Survey of India for a shooting at Ahmedabad at the medieval mosque and tomb complex, Sarkhej Roza.

Release 
The film was scheduled to be released on Eid, 6 July 2016, but was postponed to avoid box office competition with Salman Khan starrer Sultan. The film was then rescheduled to be released on 26 January 2017, India's Republic Day, which conflicted with Hrithik Roshan starrer Kaabil, but then both films were moved to 25 January 2017. Raees opened to 3,500 screens worldwide. The film is streaming on Netflix.

In March 2016, a legal notice was sent by an alleged gangster, Abdul Latif's son, Mustak, asking why a film on his father's life was being made.

A few days after the 2016 Uri terror attack, Maharashtra Navnirman Sena (MNS) asked for a ban on films featuring Pakistani actors on the basis that the actors were not openly condemning terrorism. Raees was on their list because cast member Mahira Khan is Pakistani. MNS put forward a condition to lift the ban, that producers shall never cast Pakistani artists in future and they have to give crores as penance to the Indian Army welfare fund, but the Indian Army refused to accept it by saying sacrifices should not be politicised. Later, ban was lifted without the conditions on Raees as demanded by MNS.

Farhan Akhtar, co-producer of the film said Raees will never pay, and was threatened by MNS. The Chief Minister of Maharashtra and member of the BJP and the RSS, Devendra Fadnavis said at the meeting with MNS and the producers ₹5 crore as contribution to the Indian Army welfare fund was not quoted compulsory and was never a condition for lifting ban on films featuring Pakistani actors demanded by MNS, and earlier at an event praised Shah Rukh Khan as an "icon" and a "proud Mumbaikar".

Box office 
Worldwide, Raees has grossed , making it the highest-grossing Bollywood film of 2017 at the time, the highest-grossing January release for a Hindi film since 1994, and one of the top 20 highest-grossing Indian films of all time.

Raees grossed ₹128 crore worldwide in its opening weekend. Domestically, it grossed  in India.

Raees was the most pirated Hindi film of 2017, with 62 lakh online file sharers worldwide, primarily in India and Pakistan. This negatively affected the film's domestic box office performance in India.

Domestic 
In three weeks film grossed . In four weeks film grossed .

Overseas 
In overseas market, in the five-day extended first weekend Raees grossed 6.7 million (45.63 crore). In four weeks film grossed . Overseas, Raees grossed US$14.1 million (₹95.88 crore), making it Bollywood's highest overseas grosser of 2017. It also set the record for being the highest earning Bollywood weekend grosser ever in Singapore.

Critical reception

India 
Taran Adarsh of Bollywood Hungama rated the film 4 out of 5 stars and said director Dholakia "depicts the power play and the cat and mouse chase between Raees and the honest cop Jaideep with flourish and that, in my opinion, is the mainstay of the enterprise." Nihit Bhave of The Times of India rated the film 3.5 out of 5 stars and wrote, "The movie can feel a bit long, but if you're going for a great SRK performance and some good ol' popcorn-entertainment, it might just 'raees' to the occasion." Devarshi Ghosh of India Today rated the film 3.5 out of 5 stars and wrote, "The filmmaking is pure masala and this is one well-cooked masala movie. The story is not surprising, but Rahul Dholakia's treatment seems fresh."

Rajeev Masand of News 18 gave the film 3 out of 5 stars and said, "The film, expectedly, is powered by the star wattage of Shah Rukh Khan himself, as most of his films usually are. From his introduction scene, lacerating his back during a Moharram gathering, to a Scarface-like shootout, all guns blazing, to his many moments simmering with rage, Shah Rukh commands your attention. In more pensive moments and a quiet breakdown scene, he reveals the actor behind the star."

Writing for The Hindu, Namrata Joshi gave the film 3 out of 5 stars and wrote, "In Raees, he (SRK) and Dholakia would rather dare than play it safe. The character, a complicated portrayal, is in line with grounding SRK in his faith, and making him rise above it." Saibal Chatterjee of NDTV rated the film 3 out of 5 stars and commented, "Raees might be markedly unfamiliar territory, but [Dholakia] doesn't let that fact undermine the content and its context. The balance that he achieves lends the film sustained solidity." Shubhra Gupta of The Indian Express rated the film 2.5 out of 5 stars and wrote, "SRK breaks through in some moments but is stymied by florid, seen-too-many-times flourishes in Raees. It is Nawazuddin Siddiqui who really shines through." and Anupama Chopra gave the film 3 out of 5 stars, saying "The best way to enjoy Raees then is to manage expectations first. This is an uneven film. In places, you will applaud and whistle. But you might also find yourself utterly exhausted."

Rohit Bhatnagar of Deccan Chronicle rated the film 2 out of 5 stars and said, "The film could have been much more thrilling and gut-wrenching." Raghav Jaitly from Zee News rated the film 3 out of 5 stars and applauded its "powerhouse performances". He described the film, "From dialogue delivery to slow-motion sequences, the movie will give you goosebumps at times. If you want to witness high-octane actions, intense emotions and sincere filmmaking, then go for 'Raees'. It amalgamates Shah Rukh's charm and Rahul's intelligence." Writing for Hindustan Times, Sarit Ray gave the film 2 out of 5 stars, saying "Raees also deserves credit for going with a principal set of Muslim protagonists, a rarity for present-day Bollywood. Nawazuddin Siddiqui has the best lines. Raees perhaps works only as an SRK showcase."

Overseas 
Sneha May Francis and Mahwash Ajaz of Dawn respectively commented, "This isn't a fine film. It's vintage Bollywood fluff, which SRK will manage to turn into box-office gold." and, "Raees is the story of neither a hero nor a villain – it is the story of a man who lived in a corrupted system with corrupted morals." Manjusha Radhakrishnan of Gulf News gave the film 3 out of 5 stars and wrote, "While the film is engaging, what lets it down are some of the contrived and ridiculous twists in the second half. But the climax packs a punch, and that misgiving – 'where is this film going?' – is erased." Rachel Saltz of The New York Times stated that "Avoiding flabby subplots, Mr. Dholakia keeps "Raees" taut and suspenseful, even at two and a half hours, though it probably has a song too many."

Controversies 

Ankita Shorey was the first choice for the female lead of the film, but Mahira Khan got the role; Shorey confirmed that the consideration was not due to the nationality. A news report  stated that Shorey had been "replaced" and had been a "part of the project." Shorey later stated that she did not speak about "replacement", and did not spell the "part of the project" phrase in the interview, the actual phrase was "strongly considered for the project." The journalist who took her interview, later apologized for it.

Farhan Akhtar clarified that if the film was shot after the terror attack, they never would have signed Mahira Khan. He concluded by saying showing solidarity to Indian Army is up to them, and the only Indian government has the authority to brief them regarding dealing with their conscience, and not by any outsiders.

On 1 December 2016, Shah Rukh Khan met MNS supreme Raj Thackeray to assure him that Mahira Khan won't be coming to India to promote the film. On 11 January 2017, it was reported that Shiv Sena again demanded a ban on the movie. They had reportedly threatened the cinema owners in Chhattisgarh not to screen the film.

Three days before the release of the film, Kailash Vijayvargiya, National General Secretary of BJP, termed Raees as "dishonest" and "anti-national" film, while termed Kaabil as "Patriotic" film; he had stated in 2015 that Shah Rukh Khan was a defector and had not reacted to the 1993 Bombay bombings or 2008 Mumbai attacks.

The film is banned in Pakistan due to its "objectionable content" by Central Board of Film Censors, the regulatory body and censorship board of Pakistan.

Music 

The soundtrack of the film was released by Zee Music Company.

The song "Laila Main Laila" from the 1980 film Qurbani was written by Indeevar, and was originally composed by Kalyanji–Anandji, and it was sung by Kanchan, Amit Kumar, Chorus, has been recreated for the film by composer Ram Sampath. Additional lyrics are written by Javed Akhtar.

As of October 2018, the soundtrack has received over 80 crore (800million) streams on YouTube.

Marketing 
Raees was promoted on various shows which includes The Kapil Sharma Show and Bigg Boss 10, and was also promoted in Dubai. Shah Rukh Khan and Sunny Leone even took a special train ride on August Kranti Rajdhani Express from Mumbai to Delhi on 23–24 January 2017 for promotions, but Farid Khan Sherani, fan of Shah Rukh Khan, also a member of Samajwadi Party died in hospital due to stampede on Vadodara railway platform when the train was leaving the station after a long halt for the promotion in front of huge crowd, many were injured too. Shah Rukh Khan later condoled for his fan's death.

Accolades

Notes

References

External links 

 
 
 
 Raees at Bollywood Hungama

2017 crime action films
2017 films
2017 action drama films
2017 crime drama films
2017 action thriller films
2017 crime thriller films
2010s vigilante films
2010s Hindi-language films
Films set in the 1980s
Films set in Gujarat
Films shot in Gujarat
Films shot in Mumbai
Indian nonlinear narrative films
Films directed by Rahul Dholakia
Indian crime action films
Indian crime drama films
Indian action thriller films
Indian historical action films
Indian pregnancy films
Indian films about revenge
Indian vigilante films
2017 masala films
Films scored by Ram Sampath
Indian gangster films
1993 Bombay bombings
D-Company
Red Chillies Entertainment films